The Queenston Heights is a geographical feature of the Niagara Escarpment immediately above the village of Queenston, Ontario, Canada. Its geography is a promontory formed where the escarpment is divided by the Niagara River. The promontory forms a cliff face of approximately 100 m (approximately 300 ft).

War of 1812
Queenston Heights was the site of the War of 1812 Battle of Queenston Heights, where Major-General Sir Isaac Brock was killed in action in the defence of Upper Canada (now Ontario).  It is mentioned in the 1867 song "The Maple Leaf Forever":

   
At Queenston Heights and Lundy's Lane 
Our brave fathers, side by side, 
For freedom, homes, and loved ones dear, 
Firmly stood and nobly died.

And those dear rights which they maintained, 
We swear to yield them never.  
Our watchword evermore shall be, 
The Maple Leaf forever!

War memorials
Queenston Heights is the site of Brock's Monument and a monument to War of 1812 heroine Laura Secord. There are 235 stairs inside the monument, leading to a viewing area close to the top. The site was designated a National Historic Site of Canada in 1968. Fort Drummond, also located at Queenston Heights, is separately recognized as a National Historic Site.

References

External links
 Official website
 Art works of the Battle of Queenston Heights Niagara Falls Public Library (Ont.)

Canadian military memorials and cemeteries
Geography of the Regional Municipality of Niagara
Niagara-on-the-Lake
National Historic Sites in Ontario
Monuments and memorials in Ontario
Landforms on the National Historic Sites of Canada register
War of 1812 National Historic Sites of Canada